In with the Flynns is a British sitcom created by Caryn Mandabach, produced by Caryn Mandabach Productions, and broadcast by the BBC. The first series began broadcast on 8 June 2011 for six episodes on BBC One and in high definition on BBC One HD in the United Kingdom. It is an adaptation of the American series Grounded for Life.

Set in Manchester in northern England, the series stars Will Mellor as Liam Flynn, Niky Wardley as his wife Caroline, and Nadine Rose Mulkerrin, Daniel Rogers, and Lorenzo Rodriguez as their children, Chloe, Steve, and Mikey. Other characters include Liam's brother Tommy (Craig Parkinson) and Liam and Tommy's father Jim (Warren Clarke).

The working title of Meet the Doyles was changed during production. The theme song is "For Anyone" by the band Beady Eye.

On 22 December 2011, Will Mellor confirmed in an interview that the show had been given a second series, which was filmed and broadcast in 2012. Taping took place at the new dock10, MediaCityUK and the second series, of six episodes, began on BBC One on 17 August 2012.

On 30 October 2012, it was reported that BBC One had cancelled In with the Flynns.

Production
The series is set in Manchester in the north of England, but as with many British sitcoms, it was filmed in front of a live studio audience in London, in this case at Teddington Studios. The show is written by a team of writers, giving it a feel of an American comedy. The show makes frequent use of flashbacks to portray past events mentioned in the dialogue. A first series containing six episodes aired on BBC One throughout June and July 2011. A second series containing six episodes aired again on BBC One from 17 August 2012.

Characters
Will Mellor as Liam Flynn, husband to Caroline and father of three children, Liam is a doting father and a loving husband. Although he and Caroline were married when they were teenagers, they are still very much in love.
Niky Wardley as Caroline Flynn, Liam's wife and mother of three children. Caroline loves her children and her husband greatly, and she is forced to tolerate Liam's brother and father living in her house, although she rarely complains about them.
Warren Clarke as Jim Flynn, Liam, Tommy and Kevin's widowed father. He is a fan of fishing, and is often seen boring his family with his stories. He does not like Caroline's family and is always trying to impress his grandchildren.
Craig Parkinson as Tommy Flynn (Series 1), Liam's older brother is a freeloading workshy man who sleeps on Liam's sofa, much to Liam and Caroline's disapproval. In Series 2, Tommy has run away with his little brother Kevin's fiancée and it is presumed that the Flynns have lost contact with him.
Orla Poole (2011) / Nadine Rose Mulkerrin (2012) as Chloe Flynn
Daniel Rogers (2011–12) as  Steve Flynn
Lorenzo Rodriguez as Mikey Flynn
Alex Carter as Kevin Flynn, Liam's younger brother (Series 2), he comes to live with his father Jim when his brother, Tommy, runs away with his fiancée. He remains fearful of women., and has a gambling habit. 
Beverley Callard as Pat, the mother of Caroline (Series 2).
Paul Copley as Alan, the father of Caroline (Series 2). Pat and Alan live in Spain.

Reception
The first episode brought mixed reviews from television critics. The Telegraph's James Walton commented negatively "this is exactly the kind of sitcom that comedies such as The Royle Family and Outnumbered are meant to have seen off long ago - and whose strange persistence traditionally fills critics with a mixture of puzzlement and dismay". However, he went on to praise the performances of the cast, and called it "a perfectly acceptable 30 minutes of undemanding television". In much the same way, the Guardian'''s reviewer Zoe Williams called it "bland, smooth and unremarkable" and "the acting is not great" but she also acknowledged that the problem was the set-up: "if they want us to fall in love with the Flynns...they need to be a bit more like actual people". One more positive review came from Metro, who said "Don't set your expectations too high. It's not completely terrible, and has a decent cast...Maybe it’ll settle into a more chucklesome formula once this set-up episode’s out of the way.

Series two of the show was also criticized by some commentators. Sam Wollaston of The Guardian wrote, "The BBC's in With the Flynns feels like a tired, lame sitcom because it is a tired, lame sitcom.", while Phil Harrison of Time Out wrote, "Sky has thrown down the gauntlet to the BBC lately. Daring dramas, comedies that actually raise a chuckle and even the annexation of one of the Beeb's comedy crown jewels in Alan Partridge. How will Auntie respond? With a second series of piss-weak sitcom in with the Flynns, that's how.... the dialogue is flat, the jokes telegraphed and the characterisation superficial". However, Emma Sturgess, also writing for The Guardian, was more positive; "...although in with the Flynns is pretty broad, it's not total carp".

Episodes

Series One (2011)

Series Two (2012)
A second series was confirmed on 22 December 2011 and was filmed and broadcast in 2012. There was one cast change, with Chloe Flynn being portrayed by Nadine Rose Mulkerrin instead of previous actress Orla Poole. In addition, the character of Tommy Flynn, portrayed by Craig Parkinson, was dropped and the character of a third brother, Kevin Flynn (portrayed by Alex Carter), was added for Series 2.

The series consists of six 30-minute episodes, and began broadcasting on 17 August 2012 on BBC One.

DVD release
A DVD of the first series of In with the Flynns'' was released on 3 September 2012.

References

External links

2011 British television series debuts
2012 British television series endings
2010s British sitcoms
BBC television sitcoms
British television series based on American television series
BBC high definition shows
Television shows set in Manchester
English-language television shows
Television shows shot at Teddington Studios